Mamy Rakotoarivelo (died on 28 July 2017) was a Malagasy politician.  A member of the National Assembly of Madagascar, he was elected as a member of the Tiako I Madagasikara party, representing the third constituency of Antananarivo.
He was found dead on 28 July 2017 with a gunshot wound and a gun near his hands.

References

20th-century births
2017 deaths
Year of birth missing
Emlyon Business School alumni
Members of the National Assembly (Madagascar)
Tiako I Madagasikara politicians
People from Antananarivo